Marjorie Dodd Letts (January 14, 1894 in Cincinnati, Ohio – August 1968 in Du Page, Illinois) was an important amateur tennis player and golfer in the early part of the 20th century.

Playing at a time when there were no women's rankings, she was nonetheless one of the best ever to come out of the Midwest Section of the United States Tennis Association (known then as the Western Section). At the Cincinnati Masters, Dodd appeared in eight finals, winning singles titles in 1911 & 1912, and reaching the singles finals in 1908 & 1913. She won doubles titles in 1908 (with Martha Kinsey) and 1906 (with May Sutton) and was a doubles finalist in 1913. She also was a mixed doubles finalist (with Robert LeRoy) in 1907.

After her notable tennis career, she switched to golf, winning the Women's Western Golf Championships three times (1916, ‘17 & ‘20) and reaching the finals in 1910 and 1919.  One of her most notable victories came in the 1921 U.S. Women's Amateur Championship when she defeated Cecil Leitch, called by the New York Times "the greatest golfing woman the world has ever seen." She also won two Chicago team championships with Mrs. Melvin Jones of Olympia Fields, Illinois.

Dodd Letts also served in 1915 as a director of the Women's Western Golf Association playing out of the Cincinnati Golf Club.

She married Frederick Clayton Letts, Jr., on February 5, 1916, and the couple divorced on November 12, 1930.

Sources
From Club Court to Center Court by Phillip S. Smith (2008 Edition)
New York Times, October 6, 1921
Massillon, Ohio, Evening Independent Newspaper, Thursday, November 13, 1930 (page five)
Golf Illustrated, August, 1924

American female tennis players
1894 births
1968 deaths
Tennis people from Ohio
20th-century American women
Tennis players from Cincinnati